Marianne Dickerson (November 14, 1960 – October 14, 2015) was a female long-distance runner from the United States.

Dickerson was born in St. Joseph, Illinois. She was a star runner first at St. Joseph-Ogden High School, then at the University of Illinois after a stint on a track scholarship to the University of Michigan. (She earned a bachelor's in general engineering from the University of Illinois and a master's in industrial engineering from the University of Michigan). Against the advice of her coach, she entered a Missouri race, a portion of the inaugural Avon Marathon series.  Winning the race qualified her for the series championship in Los Angeles, where she placed second behind Julie Brown.  That race served as the qualifier to the World Championships.  She was a surprise to take the silver medal at the 1983 World Championships in Helsinki, Finland.  While Grete Waitz was a clear winner, Dickerson was in fourth place behind Rosa Mota and Raisa Smekhnova, that group having already dispatched stars Joyce Smith, Laura Fogli and Christa Vahlensieck.  Dickerson passed Mota outside the stadium then surged to dramatically beat Smekhnova (a sub-4 minute 1500m runner) on the track inside the stadium.

Injuries prevented her from competing in the 1984 Olympic Trials.  She qualified for the 1988 trials by winning the Baltimore Marathon, but faded in the middle of those trials.

After getting her degree in Engineering, she went to the Harvard Business School.  In 2015, she returned to her alma-mater high school as an assistant coach before her death.

Achievements
All results regarding marathon, unless stated otherwise

References

1960 births
2015 deaths
American female long-distance runners
People from Champaign County, Illinois
Grainger College of Engineering alumni
World Athletics Championships medalists
University of Michigan College of Engineering alumni
Harvard Business School alumni
20th-century American women